"All Hail, Liberia, Hail!" is the national anthem of Liberia. The lyrics were written by Daniel Bashiel Warner (1815–1880), who later became the third president of Liberia, and the music was composed by Olmstead Luca (1826–1869). It became the official national anthem upon Liberia's independence in 1847.

History

1974 proposed change to lyrics 
On 22 July 1974, the Legislature of Liberia passed an act giving authorization to the president to establish a commission to give consideration to possible changes to a number of national symbols, including "All Hail, Liberia, Hail!" and the flag. President William Tolbert appointed 51 members to the Commission on National Unity. The commission was headed by McKinley Alfred Deshield Sr., and was also called the Deshield Commission.  The commission sought to reexamine the symbols and remove divisive aspects of them. The commission submitted their report on 24 January 1978. The report recommended changing the word "benighted" in the anthem to the word "undaunted". The proposed change to the anthem was never made.

Lyrics

Notes

References

External links
Liberian national anthem sang by a Liberian choir in a Baptist Church. (archive link)

African anthems
Liberian music
National symbols of Liberia
National anthem compositions in B-flat major